Imam Khomeini International Airport (IATA: IKA; ICAO: OIIE) is the primary international airport of Tehran, the capital city of Iran, located  south of Tehran. All international flights in Tehran are currently served by this airport, and all domestic flights are served by Mehrabad Airport. IKA ranks third in terms of total passenger traffic in Iran after Tehran Mehrabad Airport and Mashhad Airport. The airport is operated by the Iran Airports Company and is the primary operating base for Iran Air and Mahan Air.

History

Early planning
Construction of the airport began prior to the 1979 Iranian revolution. The original designers were Tippetts-Abbett-McCarthy-Stratton (TAMS), an American engineering and architectural consulting partnership. A local joint venture was formed between TAMS and local firm Abdol Aziz Farmanfarmaian Associates called TAMS-AFFA, to carry out the full design and supervision of construction. The original design of the airport was going to be similar to DFW airport. Following the Iranian revolution, however, the project was abandoned until the government of Iran decided to design and build the airport using local expertise.

Construction
French firm ADP was selected to head the local designers and engineering firms. A turnkey design and build contract was awarded to a local general contractor company, Kayson Co., to carry out and manage the construction. After two years this contract was abandoned and was awarded to a bonyad, the Mostazafan Foundation.

Initial opening

After construction of Terminal 1 was completed by the Mostazafan Foundation, the Iranian Civil Aviation Organization decided to turn the management of operations along with the construction of the second terminal to the TAV (Tepe-Akfen-Vie) consortium consisting of two Turkish (Tepe and Akfen) and an Austrian (Vie) companies. The original opening was scheduled for 11 February 2004, the onset of the auspicious "Ten-Day Dawn" (1–11 February) celebrations, marking the anniversary of the 1979 Islamic Revolution. There were numerous issues surrounding the construction of the airport including the supply of fuel to the new airport, and a delay in signing a deal with the Iranian oil ministry forced a delay in the opening of the airport until 8 May 2004.

Just prior to the opening on 8 May, two local airlines refused to switch to the new airport. Economic Hayat-e No daily quoted Ali Abedzadeh, director of semi-privately owned Iran Aseman Airlines, as saying "We are not flying from an airport run by foreigners." TAV officials were ordered to withdraw their personnel and equipment from the airport on 7 May 2004, and operations were handed over to Iran Air. "I think they (the armed forces) were given false reports that the Turks were still on the site, while they had all evacuated the airport by Friday," airport manager Hossein Pirouzi said. However, on 8 May, a few hours after the opening of airport, the Revolutionary Guards of the Iranian Armed Forces closed it, citing security fears over the use of foreigners in the running of the airport. Only one Emirates flight from Dubai was allowed to land. The second flight from Dubai, which was an Iran Air flight, was forced to land in Isfahan International Airport, because the Mehrabad Airport did not allow it to land there after the Tehran international airport was closed by the armed forces. The rest of the flights were diverted to Mehrabad. On 11 May, in a meeting of the Turkish Foreign Ministry Undersecretary Ugur Ziyal and Iranian Foreign Minister Kamal Kharrazi, the Turkish expressed unease about the actions of the Iranian armed forces. The airport reopened on 13 May, as deputy head of Iran's Joint Chiefs of staff Brigadier-General Alireza Afshar stated "because foreign companies will no longer be in charge of the airport's operation, security obstacles are removed."

Second opening

In April 2005, the $350 million Imam Khomeini International Airport was reopened under the management of a consortium of four local airlines—Mahan Air, Aseman, Caspian Airlines and Kish Air—although no formal contract appeared to have been awarded. Soon later management of the airport was transferred to the Iran Airports Company which in behalf of Iranian Ministry of Roads and Transportation is in charge of operating all civil and governmental Iranian airports except some belonging to special organizations like Oil ministry or Armed Forces.

Infrastructure

Passenger terminals
As of June 2022, IKIA has two active terminals.

Terminal 1
Terminal 1, IKIA's first active terminal, has a total annual handling capacity of 6.5 million passengers and 120,000 tonnes of cargo. In 2017, it handled nearly 9 million passengers.

Salam Terminal (Terminal 2)
Salaam Terminal, IKIA Second Active Terminal, has a capacity of 5 million passengers per year. While originally intended as a dedicated pilgrimage terminal, according to Iran's former Minister of Roads and Urban Development Abbas Akhoundi, it will be open to all varieties of flights.

Iranshahr Terminal (Terminal 3)
IKIA's proposed third terminal, called the Iranshahr Terminal, is currently in its planning phase. In mid-February 2016, its development contract had been awarded to the Dutch engineering firm Netherlands Airport Consultants (NACO), a subsidiary of Royal HaskoningDHV. However, in 2017, NACO withdrew from the contract after its failure to obtain financing due in part to US sanctions against Iran. The Iranshahr Terminal is planned to have a capacity of 20 million passengers per year, which would bring the airport's total passenger capacity to 30 million passengers per year.

Runways
There are currently two runways at IKA of which only one is operational. The operational runway is equipped with the ILS CAT II since August 2009. A second ILS system was purchased seven years ago to serve the other runway but the selling firm refused to set it up due to sanctions against Iran. The ILS was installed by Iranian technicians. A third runway positioned to the south of the existing runways and passenger terminal is in final stages of construction.

Hotels
In October 2015, French corporation AccorHotels opened its Novotel and Ibis-branded hotels on the airport premises, marking the entry of the first international hotel chain into the Iranian market since the 1979 revolution. The hotel chains left Iran in 2021 after the ending of their contract, renaming the hotels to Remis and Rexan, The two hotels are connected to Terminal 1 by a sky bridge passing through the airport metro station.

Airlines and destinations

Passenger

Cargo

Statistics
In 2013, the airport handled 4.756 million passengers, a 20% increase over the previous year. This made it the eleventh busiest airport by international passenger traffic in the Middle East. The airport handled 98,904 tonnes of cargo in 2013. The total number of commercial aircraft movements was 36,827 in 2013.

Annual traffic

Ground transportation

Metro
The airport is served by the Imam Khomeini International Airport Metro Station. The metro connection for IKIA was opened on 7 August 2017, as a station on the new branch of Tehran Metro Line 1. Passengers must change trains at Shahed - Bagher Shahr Metro Station to access the rest of Line 1. There are provisions for a second station serving the planned Iranshahr Terminal (Terminal 3) in the future.

High-speed rail
The airport is planned to be served by the Tehran-Qom-Isfahan High Speed Rail. The new link will enable direct rail access from the cities of Qom and Isfahan and a fast non-stop connection to Tehran Railway Station. The line is currently in early planning and construction phase.

Highway
Imam Khomeini International Airport is accessible from Tehran by car, taxi and shuttle buses via Tehran-Qom and Tehran-Saveh freeways. Airport-operated taxis serve arriving passenger 24/7. In 2017, a typical taxi journey from the airport to the center of Tehran takes around 45 minutes which costs about 1,400,000 to 1,800,000 to Iranian rial or US$7 and are often light yellow Toyota Camry, Toyota RAV4, Volkswagen Caddy or IKCO Samand.

 Freeway 5
 Freeway 7

Accidents and incidents
 On 15 July 2009, Caspian Airlines Flight 7908, a Tupolev Tu-154 bound for Yerevan, Armenia crashed into a field in the village of Farsiyan in Qazvin province (north-western Iran), 16 minutes after take-off from Imam Khomeini International Airport. All 168 passengers and crew were killed.
 On 8 January 2020, Ukraine International Airlines Flight 752 was shot down by the Iranian Revolutionary Guard shortly after takeoff from Imam Khomeini International Airport, killing all 176 people on board.

See also
Iran Civil Aviation Organization
Transport in Iran
List of airports in Iran
List of the busiest airports in Iran
List of airlines of Iran

References

External links

Official website

CIP booking in Tehran

Airports in Iran
Transport in Tehran
Buildings and structures in Tehran
Airports established in 2004
2004 establishments in Iran
Ruhollah Khomeini